Kiril Kadiiski  is a Bulgarian poet, essayist and translator born on 16 June 1947. He is well known as a translator inside his native Bulgaria and is famous as a poet in France where he is director of the Bulgarian Cultural Institute. He has also been awarded a number of Bulgarian and international prizes: Ivan Franko (Ukraine) in 1989, the European Grand Prize (Romania) in 2001 and the Max Jacobs International Poetry Prize for his collected works (France) in 2002. He was awarded the title Knight of the Order of Arts and Letters for achievements in the field of French culture by the French Government.

In 1995 Kadiiski announced his discovery in Sofia of the lost poem of Blaise Cendrars La Légende de Novgorode, the bona-fides of which is now in full dispute.

References

1947 births
Living people
Bulgarian male poets
People from Kyustendil
Bulgarian expatriates in France